East End is a rural locality in the Gladstone Region, Queensland, Australia.

Geography
The Bruce Highway enters the locality from the south-west (West Stowe) and exits to the north (Mount Larcom).

East End railway station is a railway station on the Blackwater railway system.

History
The area was originally known as Wilmott after a squatter called Wilmott who brought two flocks of sheep into the area in 1855.

Willmott State School opened on 26 April 1915. In 1936, it was renamed East End State School. The school closed in 1963.

In the 2011 census, East End was included with neighbouring Bracewell; together they had a population of 462 people.

Heritage listings 
East End has a number of heritage-listed sites, including:

 Mount Larcombe Station Original Homestead Site, 52780 Bruce Highway

Education 
There are no schools in East End. The nearest government primary schools are Mount Larcom State School in neighbouring Mount Larcom to the north and Yarwun State School in Yarwun to the east The nearest government secondary schools are Mount Larcom State School (to Year 10) in neighbouring Mount Larcom and Gladstone State High School in West Gladstone to the east.

Calliope State High School in Calliope to the south-east opened in 2020 and will offer secondary education to Year 10 from 2022 and to Year 12 from 2024. Once fully operational, it will be closer than Gladstone State High School.

See also 

 List of schools in Central Queensland

References

Further reading 

  — includes Cedar Vale State School and East End State School

  — also includes closed schools: Bracewell State School, Raglan State School, Cedar Vale State School, East End State School, Hourigan Creek School, Hut Creek School, Langmorn School, Langmorn Creek Crossing School, Machine Creek State School

Gladstone Region
Localities in Queensland